The British HIV Association (BHIVA) is an organisation of healthcare professionals interested in the treatment and care of people with HIV.

The current BHIVA Chair is Dr Laura Waters.

The aims of BHIVA are, to advance:
 Promotion of good practice in the treatment of HIV
 Public education through the promotion and dissemination of research

Conferences
BHIVA holds two national conferences per year, the BHIVA National Conference in April and the BHIVA Autumn Conference.

Guidelines
BHIVA produce guidelines which are accredited by the UK National Institute for Health and Care Excellence (NICE).

Guidelines produced by BHIVA include:
 Pre-exposure prophylaxis (PrEP) guidelines
 Treatment of HIV-1 positive adults
 Use of Vaccines in HIV-positive adults
 Post-exposure prophylaxis (PEP) guidelines
 Opportunistic infection in HIV-positive individuals

See also 
 HIV/AIDS in the United Kingdom

References

HIV/AIDS organisations in the United Kingdom
Medical associations based in the United Kingdom